Mark J. Sokolich (born 1963) is an American attorney and politician. He serves as the mayor of Fort Lee, New Jersey. He is also the managing partner of the law firm that he founded. He is a member of the Democratic Party.

Early life
Sokolich is of Croatian (possibly from the Istrian region), descent and was raised in Fort Lee. His father died when he was 12 years old, and his mother died the following year.

Sokolich graduated from Fort Lee High School. He played basketball and baseball in high school, and was named All-State in basketball and All-County in baseball. Though universities offered him scholarships to play basketball, he broke his ankle during his senior year of high school, and the scholarship offers were withdrawn. Sokolich enrolled at Rutgers University, and he walked on to the Rutgers Scarlet Knights men's basketball team.  He earned his bachelor's degree from Rutgers. Sokolich earned a juris doctor from Seton Hall University School of Law, which he attended at the same time as Chris Christie.

Career
Sokolich worked in a few law firms, before forming his own, Sokolich & Macri, in 1998, of which he serves as the managing partner. He is also a director of ConnectOne Bank.   

Sokolich served on the Fort Lee City Council for four years before being elected mayor in 2007. Sokolich replaced incumbent mayor Jack Alter as the Democratic candidate after Alter's sudden death. Sokolich was re-elected in 2011.

When Chris Christie ran for re-election in 2013, Sokolich did not endorse him, despite many other Democrats across the state doing so. It was alleged that this lack of an endorsement led Christie's deputy chief of staff to direct a Christie appointee on the board of the Port Authority of New York and New Jersey to reallocate two of the customary three toll lanes from Fort Lee to the George Washington Bridge, causing massive gridlock. The scandal, which was revealed after Christie won the election, helped cause a significant drop in Christie's popularity.

References

1963 births
Living people
American people of Croatian descent
Mayors of places in New Jersey
New Jersey city council members
New Jersey Democrats
New Jersey lawyers
People from Fort Lee, New Jersey
Rutgers Scarlet Knights men's basketball players
Seton Hall University alumni
Rutgers University alumni
American men's basketball players
Fort Lee High School alumni